The 2014 World Modern Pentathlon Championships was held in Warsaw, Poland from September 1 to September 7, 2014. The event included pistol shooting, fencing, 200m swimming, show jumping and a 3 km run.

Medal summary

Men's events

Women's events

Mixed events

Medal table

See also
 Union Internationale de Pentathlon Moderne (UIPM)

References

 Official website
 Results at Pentathlon.org (UIPM)
 AllSportDB.com event page

2014 in modern pentathlon
World Modern Pentathlon Championships
International sports competitions hosted by Poland
Modern pentathlon in Europe
Sports competitions in Warsaw
2010s in Warsaw
September 2014 sports events in Europe